Fraser MacAllister was a Scottish rugby union player, referee, and president of the Scottish Rugby Union. He played for Shawlands FP and Clarkston.

Rugby union career

Amateur career

Fraser MacAllister played for two seasons at Shawlands Academy in Glasgow, Scotland, from 1923 to 1925. He was the team's captain. He also played for Shawlands FP and Clarkston. In 1932, he retired from professional rugby due to an injury.

Referee career

From 1933 to 1953, he worked as a referee in Glasgow.

Administrative career

MacAllister served as the club secretary of Shawlands FP from 1930 to 1932 and joined the committee of Glasgow District in 1935. He became Vice-President of the Scottish Rugby Union (SRU) in 1980.

In 1981, MacAllister became the 95th President of the Scottish Rugby Union, serving from 1981 to 1982, during which he launched the construction of the East Stand of Murrayfield Stadium for its re-development.

Outside of rugby union

He was the manager of the bible department at Collins Publishers.

References

1900s births
1985 deaths

Year of birth uncertain
Scottish rugby union players
Presidents of the Scottish Rugby Union
Shawlands FP players
Rugby union players from Glasgow